José Miguel González Martín del Campo, known as Míchel (born 23 March 1963), is a Spanish former professional footballer who played as a right midfielder, currently manager of Super League Greece club Olympiacos.

He was most noted for his stellar crossing ability, also contributing with a fair share of goals. During his career he represented mainly Real Madrid – over a decade – achieving great team and individual success.

Míchel earned 66 caps for Spain from 1985 to 1992, and appeared for the nation in two World Cups (scoring four goals in the 1990 edition) and one European Championship. He started working as a manager in 2005, notably leading Olympiacos to two Super League Greece accolades.

Playing career

Club
The son of a footballer who had to retire from the game at 27 after a road accident, Míchel was born in Madrid and joined Real Madrid at the age of 13, his technique and physicality on the pitch quickly standing out. He moved quickly through the ranks to the first team, appearing – and scoring – once in the 1981–82 season, in a 2–1 away win against CD Castellón on 11 April 1982.

A member of the renowned La Quinta del Buitre, which also featured Emilio Butragueño, Miguel Pardeza, Rafael Martín Vázquez and Manolo Sanchís, Míchel never played less than 31 La Liga matches from 1985 to 1994. After helping Castilla CF to the second division title in 1984, he was instrumental in the capital club's conquests, which included six leagues and two consecutive UEFA Cups; he opened the score in the 1985 final of the latter competition, against Videoton FC.

In 1989, Míchel announced he would leave Real Madrid after having signed with an Italian side, but this never came to pass and he ended up staying until 1996. In his penultimate season, he suffered a severe knee injury which rendered him unavailable for several months, but still bounced back for a final solid year, after which he left for Atlético Celaya in Mexico – where Butragueño was also playing – shortly after the arrival at Madrid of president Lorenzo Sanz. He retired from football in 1997.

Míchel's career was not without incident: in 1988, he was hit by a bottle while on the pitch and, three years later, he was sanctioned by UEFA for using an unorthodox method of disrupting the concentration of Carlos Valderrama, in a game against Real Valladolid. The presiding judge in the case noted that "manipulating in public that of your neighbour which is a gift given exclusively to males by nature" violated a federation rule protecting a player's dignity.

International
Míchel made his debut for the Spain national team on 20 November 1985 against Austria, going on to appear in a further 65 internationals and score 21 goals (only missed a callup due to injury). He played in the 1986 and the 1990 FIFA World Cups, netting a hat-trick against South Korea in Spain's second fixture during the latter tournament (3–1) and also a penalty against Belgium in the country's final group match. 

Shortly after Javier Clemente's arrival as national boss, Míchel was deemed surplus to requirements and never called again, although only 29. All national categories comprised, he received exactly 100 caps.

Coaching career
In the summer of 2005, after working as a sports commentator with RTVE after his retirement (still active, he had already worked in the capacity at the 1994 World Cup) and also writing articles for Madrid's Marca, Míchel was appointed manager of Rayo Vallecano. The following year he returned to his alma mater as director of Real Madrid's sports city, the entire youth system, and manager duties at Real Madrid Castilla, where he coached one of his sons, Adrián; under his management the side dropped down a level into the third and he was sacked, also leaving his post in the youth sides due to disagreements with president Ramón Calderón.

On 27 April 2009, Míchel was appointed as coach of top-flight strugglers Getafe CF until the end of the season. He replaced former FC Barcelona midfielder Víctor Muñoz, and also managed Adrián, helping the club avoid relegation in the last matchday and renewing his contract for two more years the following week. He was relieved of his duties at the end of 2010–11, with the team again managing to stay afloat after finishing 16th, just one point clear of the relegation zone.

Míchel joined Sevilla FC on 6 February 2012, replacing fired Marcelino García Toral and signing until the end of the season. On 14 January of the following year, after a 2–0 away loss to Valencia CF that left the Andalusians in 12th place, he was relieved of his duties.

Míchel moved to Olympiacos F.C. in the Super League Greece on 1 February 2013, penning a contract until June 2015. In his first 18 months in charge, he won two national championships and the 2013 Greek Cup. He was fired on 6 January 2015, whilst the side was still competing in the Europa League and only a point behind PAOK FC in the domestic campaign.

On 19 August 2015, Míchel succeeded Marcelo Bielsa at the helm of Olympique de Marseille. He was sacked the following 19 April due to concerns over his behaviour, with the team ranking 15th in Ligue 1.

Míchel became Málaga CF's third manager of the season on 7 March 2017, following Juande Ramos and Marcelo Romero. He signed until 30 June 2018 but, on 13 January of that year, with his team in last position, he was relieved of his duties.

On 20 May 2019, Míchel was appointed at Club Universidad Nacional of the Mexican Liga MX. He resigned from office on 23 July 2020, due to personal and family issues.

Míchel returned to Getafe on 27 May 2021, replacing Valencia CF-bound José Bordalás. Having gained just one point from eight games of the season, he was dismissed on 4 October.

On 21 September 2022, Míchel returned to Olympiacos after seven years away, replacing compatriot Carlos Corberán.

Career statistics

Club

International goals

Managerial statistics

Honours

Player
Real Madrid
La Liga: 1985–86, 1986–87, 1987–88, 1988–89, 1989–90, 1994–95
Copa del Rey: 1988–89, 1992–93
Supercopa de España: 1988, 1989, 1990, 1993
Copa de la Liga: 1985
UEFA Cup: 1984–85, 1985–86
Copa Iberoamericana: 1994

Manager
Olympiacos
Super League Greece: 2012–13, 2013–14
Greek Football Cup: 2012–13

Individual
La Liga Spanish Player of the Year: 1986
European Cup top scorer: 1987–88
FIFA World Cup Bronze Boot: 1990
Ballon d'Or: 1987 (4th place)
World XI: 1990

See also
List of La Liga players (400+ appearances)
List of Real Madrid CF records and statistics

References

External links

Stats at Medio Tiempo 

1963 births
Living people
Spanish footballers
Footballers from Madrid
Association football midfielders
La Liga players
Segunda División players
Real Madrid Castilla footballers
Real Madrid CF players
Liga MX players
Atlético Celaya footballers
UEFA Cup winning players
Spain youth international footballers
Spain under-21 international footballers
Spain amateur international footballers
Spain international footballers
1986 FIFA World Cup players
UEFA Euro 1988 players
1990 FIFA World Cup players
UEFA Champions League top scorers
Spanish expatriate footballers
Expatriate footballers in Mexico
Spanish expatriate sportspeople in Mexico
Spanish beach soccer players
Spanish football managers
La Liga managers
Segunda División managers
Segunda División B managers
Rayo Vallecano managers
Real Madrid Castilla managers
Getafe CF managers
Sevilla FC managers
Málaga CF managers
Super League Greece managers
Olympiacos F.C. managers
Ligue 1 managers
Olympique de Marseille managers
Liga MX managers
Club Universidad Nacional managers
Spanish expatriate football managers
Expatriate football managers in Greece
Expatriate football managers in France
Expatriate football managers in Mexico
Spanish expatriate sportspeople in Greece
Spanish expatriate sportspeople in France
Spanish television presenters
Spanish association football commentators